Sukhrob Hamidov (born 14 August 1975) is a retired Tajikistan footballer who played as a forward.

Career statistics

International

Statistics accurate as of match played 11 September 2015

Honours

Club
Varzob Dushanbe
Tajik League (2): 1998, 1999
Tajik Cup (2): 1998, 1999
Regar-TadAZ
Tajik League (2): 2004, 2007
Tajik Cup (1): 2005

Individual
 Tajik League Top Goalscorer 2004: 33
 Tajik League Top Goalscorer 2007: 21

References

External links
 
 

1975 births
Living people
Tajikistani footballers
Tajikistani expatriate footballers
Tajikistan international footballers
Expatriate footballers in Kazakhstan
Tajikistani expatriate sportspeople in Kazakhstan
Expatriate footballers in Belarus
FC Shakhtyor Soligorsk players
Association football forwards
Tajikistan Higher League players